"Blame" is a song recorded and written by American singer/actress Skylar Stecker. The track, produced by Tricky Stewart, reached number one on Billboard's Dance Club Songs chart in its March 24, 2018 issue, giving Stecker her third number-one and her second as a solo artist after "Only Want You" in 2017.

Track listings
Single
"Blame" (original) – 2:52

Remixes
Blame (Dave Audé Extended Remix) – 6:18   
Blame (Alex Acosta Remix) – 5:32   
Blame (Scotty Boy Dub Extended Remix) – 4:05   
Blame (Scotty Boy Extended Remix) – 4:04   
Blame (Scotty Boy Radio Mix) – 3:37

Charts

Weekly charts

Year-end charts

References

External links
single listing at iTunes
Remix Track listing at iTunes
Official video at YouTube

2017 songs
2018 singles
Dance-pop songs
Cherrytree Records singles
Interscope Records singles
Song recordings produced by Tricky Stewart
Songs written by Dave Audé
Songs written by Lauren Dyson
Songs written by Martin Kierszenbaum